Stefan Magnus Brittmark Heggelund (born 18 October 1984) is a Norwegian communication consultant and  politician for the Conservative Party. He was elected to the Norwegian Parliament for Oslo in 2013.

Early life 
Heggelund grew up in the affluent Røa neighbourhood in Oslo. His mother is a teacher.

Political career 

He joined the Socialist Youth when he was 13. In 1999, he switched to the Norwegian Young Conservatives.

He was leader of Vestre Aker Young Conservatives from 2004 to 2005 and led Oslo Young Conservatives from 2005 to 2006. He was a member of the Central Committee of the Young Conservatives from 2006 to 2010, serving as 2. deputy leader for the organization from 2008 to 2010. He candidated for the leadership position of the Young Conservatives, but lost to Henrik Asheim who was reelected.

In 2007 and 2009, he served as city government secretary for vice mayor Merete Agerbak-Jensen. He was elected to the Oslo city council in 2011, where he is a member of the Culture and Education Committee.

In 2013, he was elected to the Parliament of Norway, having been nominated in the 6th spot on the Conservative Party ballot in Oslo.

Civil career 
Heggelund has a bachelor's degree in information and communications from BI Norwegian Business School, Oslo. He worked for the communication firm JKL group from 2009 to 2011, when he started working as a communications consultant for Nordic Choice Hotels. He was named one of Norway's biggest communication experts by Dagens Næringsliv in 2012.

Personal life 
In December 2012, Heggelund and Labour politician Hadia Tajik, who served as Norway's Minister of Culture, announced that they were a couple. Both were elected for Oslo to the Norwegian parliament in the 2013 Norwegian parliamentary election. The couple married on 28 June 2014 and got separated in 2016. Heggelund resides in Grünerløkka.

References 

1984 births
Living people
Conservative Party (Norway) politicians
Politicians from Oslo
21st-century Norwegian politicians